Bogdan Miron may refer to:

 Bogdan Ionuț Miron (born 1982), Romanian association football goalkeeper
 Bogdan Florin Miron (born 1990), Romanian association football goalkeeper